Peter Watt Dick (20 August 1927 – 22 December 2012) was a Scottish professional footballer who played as an inside forward and a wing half in the Scottish and English football leagues. He was born in Newmains.

References

 

1927 births
2012 deaths
Scottish footballers
Forth Wanderers F.C. players
Third Lanark A.C. players
Accrington Stanley F.C. (1891) players
Bradford (Park Avenue) A.F.C. players
Scottish Football League players
English Football League players
Scottish Junior Football Association players
Association football forwards